The Massachusetts Republican Party (MassGOP) is the Massachusetts branch of the U.S. Republican Party.

In accordance with Massachusetts General Laws Chapter 52, the party is governed by a state committee which consists of one man and one woman from each of the 40 State Senate districts. The state committee elects party officers including a chair. The party currently has very weak electoral power in Massachusetts. It controls none of Massachusetts' statewide or federal elected offices, and holds just 14% of its state legislative seats.

History

Founding and early history (1854–1876)
The Massachusetts Republican Party was founded in 1854. Drawing together abolitionist and nativist anti-Catholic elements, it quickly became the dominant political force in the state and a powerful arm of the national Republican Party. Significant founding figures include Senator Charles Sumner, formerly of the Free Soil Party, and Speaker of the House Nathaniel Prentiss Banks, formerly of the American Party.

At the time of the Republican Party's founding in 1854, all of Massachusetts's congressional representatives but Sumner were members of the nativist Know-Nothing Party. However, Banks's role as chairman of the 1856 Republican National Convention, his active support for the Republican presidential nominee John C. Frémont in 1856 and his focus on anti-slavery legislation as Speaker put him at odds with his party. Following the Democratic victory in the 1856 elections and the Dred Scott case in 1857, the national American Party organization collapsed, and most Northern members joined the nascent Republicans. In 1857, Banks ran as a Republican against incumbent Know-Nothing Governor Henry J. Gardner and won a decisive victory.

From 1856 until 1876, Massachusetts was among the most Republican states in the nation in presidential elections. During a sixteen-year period from the onset of the American Civil War in 1861 until 1876, every statewide and federal elected office in Massachusetts was held by a Republican.

While the party held a monopoly on power in the state, there were internal divisions between the radical abolitionist faction, represented by Sumner, and the moderate faction, represented by Banks. As Governor, Banks had a difficult time appeasing the more radical Sumner faction. Banks's stated opposition to the militant abolitionist John Brown and support for a state constitutional amendment requiring newly naturalized citizens to wait two years before becoming eligible to vote each drew support from the more conservative members of the party.

As national tensions over slavery grew more fraught, the state Republican Party became more radical. Banks briefly attempted to launch a presidential campaign in 1860 but failed to win support from the anti-slavery majority of the Massachusetts delegation. He chose not to attend the national convention and retired as Governor. Republicans nominated John Albion Andrew, a radical supporter of John Brown, as Banks's successor over Banks's preferred candidate, Henry L. Dawes.

At the 1861 state Republican convention in Worcester, Senator Sumner delivered a speech claiming that the Civil War's sole cause was slavery and the primary objective of the Union government was to destroy slavery. Sumner stated that the Union government had the power to invoke martial law and emancipate the slaves. This speech drew harsh criticism from the conservative Boston establishment but cheers from the party's abolitionists.

During and after the Civil War, Democrats and anti-war Republicans became increasingly unpopular in Massachusetts. Radical Republicans, who were most aggressively supportive of the war, consolidated power and passed a wave of reforms. To aid the war effort, Andrew rescinded a ban on immigrant militias. During his governorship, Republicans repealed the constitutional restriction on immigrant voting Banks had supported and passed the nation's first comprehensive integration laws.

Continued dominance (1876–1928)

The end of Reconstruction also signaled the end of one-party rule in Massachusetts. As the national Democratic Party gained support in the urban North, Boston became competitive in statewide elections.

In 1874, Boston mayor William Gaston became the first Democratic governor since 1851. In the 1876 elections, Republicans lost six congressional seats and Rutherford Hayes became the first Republican to lose Suffolk County. Liberal Republicans Charles Francis Adams, Sr. and Benjamin Franklin Butler left the party and staged competitive bids for Governor on the Democratic ticket.

However, Republicans were still the dominant force in the state through the end of the century, and Massachusetts continued to be a base for the national Republican Party. One national figure to emerge was Henry Cabot Lodge, a scion of wealthy and powerful Cabot and Lodge families. Lodge represented Massachusetts in the United States Senate for thirty years from 1893 to his death in 1924. Lodge was a prominent advocate for restrictions on immigration and an antagonist of Democratic President Woodrow Wilson on matters of foreign policy. When Republicans won control of the Senate in 1918, Lodge was named Senate Majority Leader and Chair of the Foreign Relations Committee and served in both positions until his death.

Following the death of President Harding, Vice-President Calvin Coolidge became the 30th President of the United States. Coolidge was previously the Governor and Lieutenant Governor of Massachusetts.

Decline (1928–1952)

The Republican dominance of Massachusetts slowly died in the 1920s and 1930s as predominantly Democratic immigrant groups changed the traditionally Republican White Anglo-Saxon Protestant (WASP) Massachusetts into the Catholic Democratic majority state that it remains today. The Democratic take-over of Massachusetts was aided by the high unionization of workers in the state, coupled with the onset of the Great Depression and the rise of the New Deal Democrats. In 1928, Catholic Al Smith became the first Democrat to carry Massachusetts in a presidential election since the party's foundation a century prior.

With the emergence of Franklin Roosevelt's New Deal coalition and the growing power of the urban and Catholic vote, Massachusetts produced victories for Democratic presidential candidates in every election from 1928 to 1948. By the 1950s, most of the urban and suburban areas of Massachusetts were largely Democratic, leaving just a few pockets of strongly Republican rural areas in the Cape and Islands region and Western Massachusetts.

Later 20th century (1950–1980)

Under control by the Kennedy family and John F. Kennedy in particular, the state Democratic Party gained massive popularity with suburban business interests as well as its traditional Catholic and immigrant base. Kennedy's victory over incumbent Henry Cabot Lodge, Jr. in 1952 is symbolic of the long-term transition of power from Republican to Democratic in the commonwealth.

As the successful 1960 Democratic candidate for president, Kennedy won a landslide victory in Massachusetts. His brother Ted Kennedy was appointed to the vacant Senate seat in 1962 and would hold that seat until his death in 2009. Since Kennedy's victory in 1960, only one Republican presidential candidate, Ronald Reagan, has carried Massachusetts.

Liberal and moderate Republicans still experienced some success at the state level. In 1966, Edward Brooke won a landslide victory to become the first popularly-elected black United States Senator. Republicans John Volpe and Elliot Richardson also won landslide victories in the governor's race and attorney general's races, respectively. Brooke was re-elected by a large margin again in 1972.

In 1978, Republicans lost their remaining Senate seat when Paul Tsongas unseated Brooke. On the state level, Democrats would take super-majorities in both houses of the state legislature, and would dominate the governorship for 22 years out of the 34-year period from 1957 to 1990.

Modern era (1980–1999)

In 1980, Republican presidential nominee Ronald Reagan carried Massachusetts, being the first Republican to do so since 1956. Massachusetts Republicans hoped his victory ushered in what appeared to be a new era for Republicans in the state.

In 1990, due to the unpopularity of then Governor Michael Dukakis at the end of his last term in office, Republicans led by gubernatorial candidate William Weld erased the Democratic super-majorities in the state legislature. However, the death of Silvio Conte in 1991 (and his succession by Democrat John Olver) also meant that for the first time, every federal elected official in Massachusetts was a Democrat.

In 1993, Peter Blute and Peter Torkildsen became the first freshman Republicans elected to Congress from Massachusetts since 1973. The hope of a Republican renaissance in Massachusetts largely dissipated in 1996, when Weld failed in his attempt to unseat Senator John Kerry and most of the Republicans gains in the State Legislature were erased. Both Torkildsen and Blute were defeated.

21st century

Despite heavy losses at all levels of government and a steady decrease in support for the national party, the Massachusetts Republican Party has been able to maintain control over the governor's office. From 1990 until 2023, the governor's office had been consistently held by a number of Republicans, only interrupted by the governorship of Deval Patrick from 2007 to 2015.

In 2010, Republicans won a shock victory when Scott Brown defeated Democratic candidate Martha Coakley in a special election to succeed Senator Ted Kennedy. Brown became the first Republican to represent Massachusetts in the Senate since 1979 and the first in Congress since 1997. However, Brown lost his bid for a full six-year term to Democratic challenger Elizabeth Warren in 2012.

In 2014, moderate Republican Charlie Baker was elected Governor, defeating Democratic nominee Martha Coakley and returning the office to Republican control after eight years. Throughout his first term, Baker consistently polled as the most popular governor in the nation. He was re-elected by a large margin in 2018. However, Republicans also lost three seats in the state legislature.

In 2020, Republicans lost three additional seats on Beacon Hill in three consecutive special elections to the Democrats.

Since 2016, much of the Massachusetts party has shifted toward the policies of Donald Trump. Shortly after the 2020 presidential election, the party endorsed Trump's false claims of election fraud, despite criticism from Governor Charlie Baker. The leadership's embrace of Trump's positions has led to infighting among moderate and pro-Trump Republicans in the post-Trump era.

Current elected officials

Members of Congress

U.S. Senate
 None

Both of Massachusetts's U.S. Senate seats have been held by Democrats since 2012. Scott Brown was the last Republican to represent Massachusetts in the U.S. Senate. First elected in the 2010 special election, Brown lost his bid for a full term in 2012 to Elizabeth Warren who has held the seat since. Edward Brooke was the last Republican to be elected to a full term in Massachusetts. First elected in 1966, Brooke lost his bid for a third term in 1978 to Paul Tsongas.

U.S. House of Representatives
None

All 9 of Massachusetts's congressional districts have been held by Democrats since 1996. The last Republicans to represent Massachusetts in the House of Representatives were Peter I. Blute and Peter G. Torkildsen. Both were elected in 1992 and subsequently defeated in the 1996 elections.

Statewide offices
None

State legislative leaders
Senate Minority Leader: Bruce E. Tarr (1st Essex and Middlesex district)
House Minority Leader: Bradley Jones Jr. (20th Middlesex)

State Senate

State House of Representatives

Mayors
Shaunna O'Connell (Taunton)
Michael A. McCabe (Westfield)
Arthur G. Vigeant (Marlborough)
Bob Hedlund (Weymouth)

Past elected officials

U.S. Senators

U.S. Representatives

1856–1874

1875–1899

1900–1924

1925–present

Governors

State legislature

Speakers of the House

Presidents of the Senate

Other statewide offices

Attorney General

Treasurer

Secretary of the Commonwealth

Auditor

State Committee officers

Source:

Party Chairs

See also

 Massachusetts Democratic Party

Sources

 Abridged version
Haynes, George Henry. Charles Sumner (1909) online edition

References

External links
Massachusetts Republican Party

1854 establishments in Massachusetts
Political parties established in 1854
 
Massachusetts
Republican Party